Bruce Fergusson Cunliffe (August 19, 1925 – April 6, 1989) is an American ice hockey player who competed in ice hockey at the 1948 Winter Olympics.

Cunliffe was a member of the American ice hockey team which played eight games, but was disqualified, at the 1948 Winter Olympics hosted by St. Moritz, Switzerland.

External links

1925 births
1989 deaths
American men's ice hockey right wingers
Ice hockey people from New Hampshire
Ice hockey players at the 1948 Winter Olympics
Olympic ice hockey players of the United States
People from Keene, New Hampshire